Silas Arngna'naaq is a retired politician from Baker Lake, Nunavut, Canada and former member of the Legislative Assembly of the Northwest Territories. He served as the Minister of Renewable Resources for the Government of the Northwest Territories.

Arngna'naaq was elected to the Kivallivik electoral district in the 1991 Northwest Territories general election. He defeated two term incumbent Gordon Wray to win the Kivallivik electoral district. Arngna'naaq ran for a second term in office in the 1995 Northwest Territories general election but was defeated by candidate Kevin O'Brien.

As of 14 April 2010 he was the Acting Senior Consumer Affairs Officer for the Government of Nunavut.

References

Living people
Members of the Legislative Assembly of the Northwest Territories
People from Baker Lake
Inuit from the Northwest Territories
Inuit politicians
Inuit from Nunavut
Year of birth missing (living people)